Carlos Daniel Nicola Jaumandreu (born 3 January 1973) is a Uruguayan former footballer.

Club career
Nicola had brief spells with San Lorenzo in the Primera División de Argentina and Atlético-PR in the Campeonato Brasileiro Série A.

International career
Nicola made four appearances for the senior Uruguay national football team from 1996 to 1997, including one match at the 1997 FIFA Confederations Cup.

References

 

1973 births
Living people
Footballers from Montevideo
Uruguayan footballers
Association football goalkeepers
Uruguay international footballers
1997 FIFA Confederations Cup players
Club Nacional de Football players
C.A. Bella Vista players
Liverpool F.C. (Montevideo) players
San Lorenzo de Almagro footballers
Club Athletico Paranaense players
Independiente Medellín footballers
C.S.D. Municipal players
Uruguayan Primera División players
Argentine Primera División players
Categoría Primera A players
Uruguayan expatriate footballers
Expatriate footballers in Brazil
Expatriate footballers in Colombia
Expatriate footballers in Guatemala
Expatriate footballers in Argentina